Sylwia Lewandowska (born 4 January 1991 in Toruń) is a Polish rower. She is a World and Olympic medallist.  At the 2012 Summer Olympics, she competed in the Women's quadruple sculls.

Career 
Lewandowska was part of the Polish quadruple sculls team that won the silver medal at the 2011 European Rowing Championships, alongside Agnieszka Kobus, Karolina Gniadek and Natalia Madaj.  She won the silver in the event again in 2012, but that time the team consisted of Lewandowska, Madaj, Kamila Socko and Joanna Leszczynska.  This was the same team that competed at the 2012 Olympics.

In 2013, the team of Lewandowska, Leszczynska, Madaj and Magdalena Fularczyk won the bronze medal at the World Championships.

References

Polish female rowers
1991 births
Living people
Olympic rowers of Poland
Rowers at the 2012 Summer Olympics
Sportspeople from Toruń
World Rowing Championships medalists for Poland
European Rowing Championships medalists